Ticket resale (also known as ticket scalping or ticket touting) is the act of reselling tickets for admission to events. Tickets are bought from licensed sellers and then sold for a price determined by the individual or company in possession of the tickets. Tickets sold through secondary sources may be sold for less or more than their face value depending on demand, which tends to vary as the event date approaches. When the supply of tickets for a given event available through authorized ticket sellers is depleted, the event is considered "sold out", generally increasing the market value for any tickets on offer through secondary sellers. Ticket resale is common in both sporting and musical events.

Ticket resale is a form of arbitrage that arises when the number demanded at the sale price exceeds the number supplied (that is, when event organizers charge less than the equilibrium prices for the tickets).

During the 19th century, the term scalper was applied to railroad ticket brokers who sold tickets for lower rates.

Purchase and re-sale methods 
Ticket re-sellers use several different means to secure premium and previously sold-out ticket inventories (potentially in large quantities) for events such as concerts or sporting events. Established re-sellers may operate within networks of ticket contacts, including season ticket holders, individual ticket re-sellers, and ticket brokers. They make a business out of getting customers hard-to-find and previously sold-out tickets that are no longer available through the official box office.

Ticket scalpers (or ticket touts in British English) work outside events, often showing up with unsold tickets from brokers' offices on a consignment basis or showing up without tickets and buying extra tickets from fans at or below face value on a speculative basis hoping to resell them at a profit. There are many full-time scalpers who are regulars at particular venues and may even have a pool of loyal buyers.

One common concern with resale is with scam artists selling fake tickets to unsuspecting buyers. Another common practice is scalpers that sell tickets that have already been scanned at the venue gate since entry is typically allowed only when a ticket is scanned for the first time.  Since the tickets were authentic, buyers do not have a way of telling if a ticket had been used or not.

A concern when buying tickets on the street from a ticket scalper or via an online auction is that the tickets sold by ticket re-sellers may themselves be stolen or counterfeit.  For many major sporting events, counterfeit tickets are auctioned off in the months leading up to the event. These criminals and their activities are not to be confused with legitimate ticket brokers and individuals who abide by the law to legally resell tickets on the secondary market.

In 2009, Ticketmaster started adoption of a "paperless" restricted ticketing, in which tickets could not be resold. Under this system, customers prove their purchase by showing a credit card and ID. The measure was taken in response to ticket scalping and resale markup of tickets on secondary markets and adopted during Miley Cyrus (2009) World Wonder Tour, although Ticketmaster first experimented it with AC/DC's Black Ice World Tour (2008–10). Ticketmaster has since changed the name of the system to "Credit Card Entry". The system requires large groups to enter together with the person who purchased tickets. Some events have Ticket Transfer which allows the tickets to change ownership and allow for tickets to be transferred through Ticketmaster's proprietary systems. These cannot be later resold or transferred via ticket exchanges such as StubHub.

Ticket presales

Obtaining tickets through special presales has become more common. These presales often use unique codes specific to an artist's fan club or venue. The advent of presales has allowed more individuals to participate in reselling tickets outside of a brokers office.

Although derivatives was a practice in use mostly in the 1980s, some ticket brokers offer tickets even before the tickets are officially available for sale. In such scenarios, those ticket re-sellers are actually selling forward contracts of those tickets.  One example is a company called TicketReserve, which is making money by selling "options" on future sporting events. This is often possible if the reseller is a season ticket holder. Season ticket holders generally receive the same exact seat locations year after year thus they can enter a contract to deliver on tickets that they own the rights to, even if those tickets have not even been printed or sent to the original ticket holder.

Automated scalping bots
In recent years, fraudsters have started to use more complex methods by which they obtain tickets for resale on the secondary market. Similar to the technology used to snatch up rare shoes and sneakers, automated bot attacks have become a common way to acquire large numbers of tickets only to resell them for higher profits. What fraudsters will do is deploy thousands of bots from untraceable IP addresses in a brute force attack as soon as a venue or ticket seller first makes them available for sale. In 2017, one of the largest online ticket sellers Ticketmaster filed a lawsuit against Prestige Entertainment for their continued use of scalper bots despite paying $3.35 million to the New York Attorney General's Office just a year prior. Ticketmaster claimed that Prestige Entertainment was able to lock up 40% of available tickets for performances of the hit Broadway musical Hamilton, as well as a majority of the tickets Ticketmaster had available for the Floyd Mayweather and Manny Pacquiao fight in Las Vegas in 2015. In an effort to curtail such behavior, Congress moved to pass the Better Online Tickets Sales Act of 2016, more commonly referred to as the BOTS act. The legislation was signed into law in December 2016 by then President Barack Obama. The BOTS act enforces several penalties and fines for parties found guilty of using bots or other technology for undermining online ticket seller systems with the hopes of selling them on the secondary ticket market.

Ticket brokering
Ticket brokers operate out of offices and use the internet and phone call centers to conduct their business. They are different from scalpers since they offer a consumer-facing storefront to return to if there is any problem with their transaction. The majority of transactions that occur are via credit card over the phone or internet. Some brokers host their own websites and interact directly with customers. These brokers are able to offer additional services such as hotel accommodation and airfare to events. Other brokers partner with online ticket exchanges. These sites act as marketplaces that allow users to purchase tickets from a large network of brokers. Some brokers offer advice on the best way to buy tickets starting with the box office and working with a broker if tickets aren't available through the box office.

Online ticket brokering is the resale of tickets through a web-based ticket brokering service. Prices on ticket brokering websites are determined by demand, availability, and the ticket reseller. Tickets sold through an online ticket brokering service may or may not be authorized by the official seller. Generally, the majority of trading on ticket brokering websites concerns itself with tickets to live entertainment events whereby the primary officially licensed seller's supply has been exhausted and the event has been declared "sold-out". Critics of the industry compare the resale of tickets online to ‘ticket touting’, ‘scalping’ or a variety of other terms for the unofficial sale of tickets directly outside the venue of an event.

The late 1990s and early 2000s saw the emergence of online ticket brokering as a lucrative business. U.S. corporate ticket reselling firm Ticketmaster developed a strong online presence and made several acquisitions to compete in the secondary markets. Securities analyst Joe Bonner, who tracks Ticketmaster's parent company New York-based IAC/InterActiveCorp, told USA Today: "You have to look at the secondary market as something that is a real threat to Ticketmaster. They missed the boat. StubHub has been around a few years now already. They weren't as proactive as they probably should have been." Ticketmaster launched fan to fan secondary ticket reselling site TicketExchange in November 2005. Ticketmaster acquired former rivals GetMeIn and TicketsNow, while eBay bought StubHub.  In 2008, the Boston Red Sox chose Ace Ticket over StubHub to sell their tickets.  There are also independently owned online ticket re-sellers such as viagogo and SeatMarket.

Criticism

For popular events with sold out tickets, re-sellers may sell the tickets at several times the face value. If re-sellers buy the tickets and the tickets are not then sold out, then they risk a loss. There may be individuals who wish to attend a popular event (and decide to sell their tickets later) and those that buy tickets in large quantities in order to resell their tickets for a profit. Some countries have restricted the unauthorized resale of tickets.

According to Stephen Barrett of Quackwatch, many online ticket resellers use URLs that are similar to official box-office websites, sometimes implying via their texts or their pictures that they are official, use internet advertising to increase traffic to their website, and don't clearly state the real prices they charge for a ticket.

International responses 

It is controversial whether tickets are goods which can be privately resold. Typically, private resale will contravene the original conditions of sale, but it is legally questionable whether the original conditions of sale are even enforceable; however, most venues declare that they have the right to refuse entry to anyone.

Australia
Depending on the ticketing body's conditions of sale, tickets may be voided if they are resold for a profit. This is so with Ticketek tickets (Ticketek is an Australian-based ticketing company).  Efforts to clamp down on ticket resale have included labeling tickets with the name or a photograph of the buyer, and banning people without tickets from the vicinity of the event to prevent the purchase of secondary market tickets.

In Australia, the secondary ticket market has been put under much scrutiny in the past few years as ticket scalpers dominated the resale ticket market. Scalpers would purchase tickets in bulk from the promoter hoping that the tickets would sell out causing an increase in demand for tickets and thus an increase in the ticket price. This caused event promoters to put restrictions on the number of tickets that can be purchased in one transaction, which has greatly reduced unfair ticket pricing. After many complaints from the community and event promoters, the DFT (Department of Fair Trading) and CCAAC (Commonwealth Consumer Affairs Advisory Council) conducted a survey discussing scalping issues and released The Ticket Scalping Issue Paper for NSW.

In Victoria, some events are declared as "major events" and protected by the Major Events Act 2009.

Canada
Quebec put into law "Bill 25" in June 2012, making it illegal for ticket brokers to resell a ticket for more than the face value of the ticket without first obtaining permission from the ticket's original vendor. Brokers reselling tickets are required to inform consumers the tickets are being resold and must tell consumers the name of the ticket's original vendor and the original face value price. The penalty to violating the law includes fines of $1,000 to $2,000 for the first offense, and as much as $200,000 for repeated violations.

In Ontario, re-selling the tickets above face value is prohibited by the Ticket Speculation Act and is punishable by a fine of $5,000 for an individual (including those buying the tickets above face) or $50,000 for a corporation.

Effective July 1, 2015, in an effort to protect consumers from purchasing fraudulent tickets, Ontario created an exemption under the Ticket Speculation Act to:
 Enable official ticket sellers to authenticate tickets that are being resold
 Permit tickets to be resold above face value in circumstances where tickets are authenticated or have a money-back guarantee
 Allow tickets to be resold at a price that includes any service fees paid when the ticket was first purchased.

Following an announcement in 2016 that The Tragically Hip's lead singer Gord Downie had been diagnosed with terminal brain cancer, the band held the Man Machine Poem Tour. Ticket re-sellers reportedly purchased two-thirds of all available tickets, to capitalize on public demand. As a result, in 2017, Ontario announced legislation to attempt to crack down on scalper bots.

Ireland

In the Republic of Ireland, there are at present no laws against ticket touting, and it is common at online outlets such as Premiertickets.ie or Needaticket.ie. In 2011, the Minister for Jobs, Enterprise and Innovation, Richard Bruton, declined to pass a law against touting, saying it would just drive re-sellers to websites based abroad. Ticketmaster, Ireland's main ticket seller, runs a service called Seatwave which resells tickets, some at wildly inflated prices. However, selling tickets in a public place (e.g. outside a venue) is illegal under the Casual Trading Act, 1995 — in 2015 Kazimierz Greń, an official of the Polish Football Association, spent the night in a cell after being arrested for selling tickets outside an Ireland–Poland football match.

Israel
In Israel, in 2002, The Knesset put into effect the 67th amendment to the Israeli Penal Code, enacting Section 194a, which outlaws ticket scalping. The new section states that unlicensed persons reselling tickets at above face value will be subject to fines. The new addition to the penal code enabled police to fight the ticket scalping of sports and music events (especially those scalpers that bought massive numbers of tickets for the sole purpose of resale), which were causing much distress to the public and enabled scalpers to evade paying taxes, but since no law strictly outlawed the practice, could not be legally fought prior to the new law.

Sweden
Ticket resale by scalpers above face value is legal in Sweden regardless of limitations imposed by event organizer.

United Kingdom
In the United Kingdom resale of football tickets is illegal under section 166 of the Criminal Justice and Public Order Act 1994 unless the resale is authorized by the organizer of the match. Secondary ticketing market StubHub have signed partnership agreements with Sunderland and Everton for 2012/13 season, whilst competitor Viagogo hold partnerships with Chelsea and other clubs.

Other than in the case of football tickets, there is no legal restriction against reselling tickets in the UK, although individual organisations (like Wimbledon) may prohibit it.

In July 2016, several prominent music managers in the UK including Ian McAndrew, Harry Magee, Brian Message and Adam Tudhope came together to fund a new initiative called the FanFair Alliance, to work towards tackling the issue of 'industrial-scale online ticket touting'.

United States

In the United States, ticket resale is a $5 billion industry.  Ticket resale on the premises of the event (including adjacent parking lots that are officially part of the facility) may be prohibited by law. These laws vary from state to state, and the majority of US states do not have laws in place to limit the value placed on the resale amount of event tickets or where and how these tickets should be sold.  Ticket re-sellers may conduct business on nearby sidewalks, or advertise through newspaper ads or ticket brokers.

New York State law only permits prices above face value by the greater of $5 or 10%.

Some US states and venues encourage a designated area for re-sellers to stand in, on, or near the premises, while other states and venues prohibit ticket resale altogether.  Resale laws, policies, and practices are generally decided, practiced and governed at the local or even venue level in the US and such laws and or interpretations are not currently generalized at a national level.

Another issue in the US is that since ticketing laws vary by state, many ticket re-sellers use a loophole and sell their tickets outside of the state of an event.

Selling tickets by ballot 

Some promoters have ceased selling tickets in the traditional first-come-first-served manner, and require prospective ticket holders to enter a "ballot" – a competition with random winners – with the prize being the opportunity to purchase a small number of tickets. The ballots are intended to discourage re-selling by making it harder to purchase large numbers of tickets because being at the front of the queue does not guarantee the holder a ticket.

Events that have sold tickets by ballot include the Big Day Out in 2007, the Ahmet Ertegün Tribute Concert – Led Zeppelin reunion concert at The O2 Arena in 2007, and the 2006 Commonwealth Games.

A similar practice used among ticket re-sellers is to list an item as an online auction (such as eBay) – most commonly an innocuous item such as a collector's card – and give the tickets as a bonus to the winning bidder; thereby not actually selling tickets in order to circumvent ticket laws. This does not actually get around eBay's selling rules, as they effectively state that the goods that the buyer receives are what the seller is selling, including any free bonuses.

Selling tickets at auction 

Ticketmaster sells tickets in online auctions, which may bring the sale price of tickets closer to market prices. The New York Times reported that this could help the agency determine demand for a given event and more effectively compete with ticket re-sellers.

Online auction sites like eBay only enforce state ticketing laws if either the buyer and/or seller resides in the state where the event is taking place.  Otherwise, there is no resale limit for tickets.

Personalized tickets and other responses 
Glastonbury Festival, which sold out 137,500 tickets within less than two hours in 2007, introduced a system in the same year whereby tickets included photographic ID of the original buyer, to enforce non-exchangeability.

For taping of Comedy Central's The Daily Show and The Colbert Report, tickets were free. However, identification of ticket holders is checked when entering and while standing in line, and most notably when progressing from the entrance queue into the studio space. These measures serve effectively as a means of preventing those reserving these sought-after tickets from selling them for a cash value upon reservation.

Some ticket sellers allow buyers to provide personal information in exchange for being allowed to buy tickets earlier.

Other uses 
Though scalping is most commonly associated with ticket sales, the process of buying desirable commodities and selling them off for a higher rate has proven lucrative with other items, particularly electronic devices such as mobile phones, video game consoles, and computer hardware. In some cases, internet resellers have developed automated bots to purchase bulk quantities of newly-released items on e-commerce websites as soon as they become available. Customers have argued that this generates an unfair advantage for the scalpers, adding to an already controversial practice, and many sites have begun implementing anti-bot measures to combat such tactics.

See also

Ticket exchange
Price discrimination
Experience good
Internet ticket fraud
Tout

References

External links
Ticket Distribution Practices : New York Attorney General Report on Ticket Resell

Tickets
Retailing by products and services sold
Black markets
Retailers by type of merchandise sold